Berezovca may refer to:

Berezovca County, Transnistria, a territorial entity in Transnistria Governorate (:ro:Județul Berezovca, Transnistria)
Berezovca District, Berezovca County, Transnistria, a territorial entity in Transnistria Governorate (:ro:Raionul Berezovca, județul Berezovca)
Berezovca, a village in Calarașovca commune, Moldova